Polypodium abitaguae is a species of fern in the family Polypodiaceae. It is endemic to Ecuador.  Its natural habitat is subtropical or tropical moist lowland forests. It is threatened by habitat loss.

References

abitaguae
Ferns of Ecuador
Endemic flora of Ecuador
Ferns of the Americas
Critically endangered flora of South America
Taxa named by William Jackson Hooker